Glenn Belezika is an English footballer. He plays as a defender.

Club career

Oldham Athletic
Belezika was awarded his first professional contract, signing a one-year contract with Oldham Athletic.
The day after signing his first professional contract he made his first appearance for the club, coming on as a late substitute in the 3–0 loss against Sheffield Wednesday in a Football League match on 9 April 2012.

On 23 August 2013, Belezika joined Conference Premier club Salisbury City on a one-month loan deal. He made his debut for the club a day later as his side beat Aldershot Town 1–0. He made a total of five appearances before returning to Oldham.

He played his first game of the 2013–14 season for Oldham in October, as his side won 2–0 at Preston North End. But on 19 October, he joined Conference Premier side Hyde on a one-month loan deal. He made his debut the next day, losing 4–3 away at Dartford. He returned to Oldham upon completion of his loan at Hyde, appearing 4 times.

Stockport County

On 27 March 2014, Belezika had his contract cancelled at Oldham Athletic by mutual consent.

In May 2014, he agreed with Stockport County manager Alan Lord to join Edgeley Park after being clubless for nearly two months. Belezika made his debut for the Stockport against North Ferriby United at right back. Belezika put in some notable performances against Tamworth FC in Stockport's 1–0 away win and again in Stockport's 3–1 win at home against Bradford PA.

On 16 January 2015, Belezika joined Northern Irish Premiership club Linfield on loan until the end of the 2014–15 season.

Non-League
In August 2015 he signed for Buxton. He then had various loan spells from Buxton – in March 2016 he joined Droylsden and in August 2016, Burscough.

In September 2016 he moved Radcliffe Borough.

Career statistics

Up to date, as of 17 August 2014.

References

External links

Profile at Oldham Athletic

1993 births
Living people
Oldham Athletic A.F.C. players
Salisbury City F.C. players
Hyde United F.C. players
Stockport County F.C. players
Linfield F.C. players
English Football League players
NIFL Premiership players
English footballers
Droylsden F.C. players
Buxton F.C. players
Burscough F.C. players
Radcliffe F.C. players
Association football defenders